Muhanga (former Gitarama, renamed in 2006) is a city in Rwanda, in the Muhanga District, in Southern Province.

Overview
Muhanga is the fourth largest city in Rwanda and the capital and largest metropolitan area in the district of Muhanga. Due to its geographical location, the city serves as the gateway to the west and south of the country. During the 1994 Rwandan genocide, Muhanga was the seat of the provisional government.

Amenities 
The city has many amenities, including the ones listed below:

 Administration & Public safety

 The offices of Muhanga District Administration
 The offices of Muhanga District Council
 The offices of Gitarama City Council
 Gitarama Police Station
 Gitarama City Jail
 Muhanga District Prison
 Muhanga High Court Building

 Educational institutions

 St. Leon Minor Seminary, Kabgayi
 Kabgayi Major Seminary
 St. Joseph Primary School
 St. Joseph Secondary School
 St. Elizabeth Nurses & Midwives College
 Kabgayi Technical College
 Kabgayi Catholic Institute
 Catholic University of Rwanda
 Gitarama Adventist Secondary School
 St. Marie-Reine Secondary School
 Groupe Scolaire de Nyabikenke
 College de Karambi
 College Adventiste de Gitwe

 Public Service
 Kabgayi Hospital
 Gitarama Regional Stadium
 Gitarama Bus Station
 Muhanga Cultural Center

 Economy
 Muhanga Farmers' Market
 A branch of Inkingi Microfinance Limited
 Three branches of Bank of Kigali
 A branch of Ecobank Rwanda
 A branch of Fina Bank Rwanda
 A branch of Banque Populaire du Rwanda SA
 Zipline delivers supplies from Muhanga to medical centres around the area using drones
 Hotel Splendid, a private hospitality establishment.

 Religion

 Kabgayi Minor Basilica
 St. Andrew's Pastoral Center
 Muhanga Zion Temple
 St. Andrew's Church

Population
The 2022 national census put the city's population at 85,000.

See also
 Districts of Rwanda
 Provinces of Rwanda

References

Populated places in Rwanda
Muhanga District
Southern Province, Rwanda